Poonthura is a suburb of Thiruvananthapuram, the capital of Kerala, India. It is on the landing path of flights to Thiruvananthapuram International Airport and is about 8 kilometers from the capital city. It has traditionally been famous for fishing and has been a prominent but crowded fishing hamlet. The community reflects typical characteristics of a marginalized group with a history of problems like communal tensions, seasonal unemployment, inadequate expenditure on health, low levels of income, poor sanitation and hygiene, domestic violence, substance abuse, and lack of basic social infrastructure.

Poonthura riots 
The hamlet of Poonthura witnessed several incidents of communal violence as an aftermath of the Babri Masjid demolition in 1992. The most serious of incidents occurred from 19 July till 21 July 1992 and is infamously referred to as the Poonthura riots. The then DGP C Subramaniam was in Chennai without submitting proper leave application whereas the next seniormost officer and then ADGP (Intelligence) Jayaram Padikkal had not acted.

Trouble was anticipated in Trivandrum, with the Rashtriya Swayamsevak Sangh (RSS) and its Islamic equivalent, the recently-formed Islamic Sevak Sangh (ISS), which was accused of having started the riots in the Kochi region in April 1992, taunting each other with provocative speeches and meetings over events in Ayodhya. The tempers spilled onto the streets. Two days of rioting left six dead, 20 injured, and hundreds of businesses and houses looted. The violence was sparked off by reports of ISS activists throwing stones at an RSS drill. Soon there were pitched battles all over the city. The highly politicized police force seemed to be in a stupor. Unfortunately, the Government instruction to only fire in the air was leaked to the rioting groups and hence the looting and rioting happened right in front of police personnel firing in the air. Later, about 100 persons were arrested, but many were released owing to political pressure. The political interference was from one of the constituents of the ruling UDF itself - the Indian Union Muslim League. The IUML, had been under pressure to break with the UDF over the Ayodhya issue.

Location St. Thomas Church Premise 
A bypass of National Highway 47 passes through SM Lock (Sree Moolam Lock) a point before arriving Poonthura, on its way to Kovalam.  Buses, both private and owned by Kerala State Road Transport Corporation ply to Poonthura from East Fort.  It is also connected by bus to other parts of the city as well.

Thiruvananthapuram International Airport is around 6 km from Poonthura.

Education

 This was a High School until 2002. This is a co-educational institution. This is a Kerala Govt. aided school under the management of Catholic Archdiocese of Trivandrum.
St. Philomena's Girls High School, Poonthura This is an aided girls' high school under the management of Canossian Sister (Daughters of Charity), a Catholic religious community and there is government school named ST THOMAS SCHOOL POONTHURA

References

External links

 About Poonthura

Suburbs of Thiruvananthapuram

st:Thomas Higher Secondary School,Poonthura